Bhosale is a variant of Bhonsle or Bhonsale, Bhosle, a prominent group within the Maratha clan system.

Bhosale is also a name. Various notable persons with the name include:

 Babasaheb Bhosale (1921–2007), Indian politician and freedom fighter who served as Chief Minister of Maharashtra
 Digvijay Bhonsale (born 1989), Indian singer, guitarist and songwriter
 Dilip Babasaheb Bhosale (born 1956), Indian jurist, Chief Justice of the High Court of Judicature at Allahabad
 Rohan Bhosale (born 1988), Indian cricketer
 Rupali Bhosale or Bhosle, Indian television actress
 Rutuja Bhosale (born 1996), Indian tennis player
 Sanket Bhosale (born 1988), Indian comedian
 Shivajirao Bhosale (1927–2010), Indian orator and thinker from Maharashtra
 Udayanraje Bhosale (born 1966), Indian politician, member of Lok Sabha from Satara Constituency in Maharashtra

See also 
 Jijabai, actually Jijabai Shahaji Bhosale
 Bhonsle (disambiguation)
 Bhosle (disambiguation)